The peace offering was one of the sacrifices and offerings in the Hebrew Bible (Leviticus 3; 7.11–34). The term  is also used in rabbinical writings. In English Bible versions the term is rendered "peace offering" (KJV 1611, JPS 1917), "offering of well-being" (NRSV).

Parallels of offerings with the same semitic root S-L-M also occur in Ugaritic texts. After the Hebrew Bible the term also occurs in the Dead Sea scrolls, for example in the Temple Scroll. In the Septuagint the term is rendered by two different Greek nouns.

See also
 Slaughter offering

References

External links
 Jewish Encyclopedia - Peace offering

Jewish sacrificial law
Judaism and peace
Positive Mitzvoth